Newcastle is an Eastside city in King County, Washington, United States. The population was 10,380 at the 2010 census and an estimated 12,292 in 2019.

Although Newcastle was not incorporated until 1994, it has been an important settlement and town since the late 19th century and played a major role in the development of Seattle and the surrounding region. Newcastle was one of the region's first coal mining areas and its railroad link to Seattle was the first in King County. Timber also played a role in the early history of Newcastle. Coal delivered by rail from Newcastle's mines to Seattle fueled the growth of the Port of Seattle and attracted railroads, most notably the Great Northern Railway.

The Newcastle coal mine began producing coal by the 1870s. More than 13 million tons of coal had been extracted by the time the mine closed in 1963. The history of Newcastle's coal mining industry and the legacy of the mines' many Chinese laborers are memorialized in place names such as Coal Creek, Coal Creek Parkway, and the Coal Creek and China Creek golf courses.

Based on per capita income, Newcastle ranks 11th of 522 areas in the state of Washington to be ranked. In CNN Money's 2011 rankings of best places to live in the United States, Newcastle was in the top 20, along with nearby Sammamish. It ranked 17th in Newsweek's 2009 rankings of best places to live in the United States.

History

Coal was discovered along Coal Creek in 1863 by surveyors Philip H. Lewis and Edwin Richardson, who had been working in the area for the General Land Office. Newcastle was named for the idiom "Coals to Newcastle" by a party of coal surveyors in 1869 according to F. H. Whitworth, who was part of the party. One of them suggested the name "New Castle" which was subsequently adopted by all parties of interest. The idiom itself refers to the English city of Newcastle upon Tyne.

Newcastle (originally spelled "New Castle") as a village was properly established by the 1870s, though the official date given for the founding of the town is 1869, as seen on the seal for the City of Newcastle. By 1872, 75–100 tons of coal per day were being produced at Newcastle. About 60 men worked at the mines. The Seattle and Walla Walla Railroad, the first railroad in King County, reached Newcastle from Seattle in 1878. Coal mining ended in 1963.

The area was an unincorporated area within King County until it incorporated as a city on September 30, 1994. Currently the city is a suburban community. Based on Newcastle's location north of Renton, south of Bellevue, and across Lake Washington from Seattle, these are the communities in which most of the residents of Newcastle work. East of southeast Lake Washington is a large quantity of hilly terrain, which creates opportunities for view properties. This created the impetus for the location of the Newcastle Golf Course, along with many high-value homes at higher elevations with views of downtown Bellevue, Seattle, and Mercer Island, as well as the Olympic Mountains. Notable attractions of the area include the Golf Club at Newcastle, a brand new Family YMCA, Lake Boren Park, a well developed trail system, and nearby Cougar Mountain in the east of Newcastle.

Newcastle and Newport Hills
The community was not always known as Newcastle. When suburban development came in the 1960s, the old mining town of Newcastle was long gone and all but forgotten. The area then became known as Newport Hills.

In the early 1990s there was a movement to incorporate as a new city. But some members of the community objected—some believed that the new city would be too small to be viable, while others feared that the city council would be in the pocket of the hilltop golf course. In 1993, five parcels of Newport Hills each voted to annex themselves into Bellevue. Those 5 parcels comprised nearly half the population of the community. They became the Newport Hills neighborhood of Bellevue. When Newport Hills incorporated as a new city the following year, their first order of business was to choose a new name, since it would now be confusing to have a city of Newport Hills adjacent to the Newport Hills neighborhood of Bellevue. Residents voted on Cougar Mountain and Newcastle, and chose the latter.

Politics
Mixed (Democratic, Republican, and Third Parties).

Newcastle trails
The city has an active trail-building community, creating a system of trails that are being integrated into new housing developments and parks.  Most of the trail-work has been completed by volunteers and the Washington Conservation Corps, sponsored by the city of Newcastle. The trail system will eventually lead all the way to Lake Washington to the west, in conjunction with Renton, and is already connected to Cougar Mountain Regional Wildland Park to the east, which is in unincorporated King County.

Zip codes
The city has not obtained its own ZIP code even though, based on the ZIP code designation, some sales taxes paid by Newcastle residents go to Renton instead of Newcastle as tax revenues (among other perceived detrimental impacts related to mail service, insurance rates, property values, and credit ratings). This is all the more troubling considering the small size of Newcastle with a small commercial district which does not create as much property tax or sales tax revenue for the city compared to neighboring cities like Renton to the south, Bellevue to the north, or Issaquah to the east.

Geography
Newcastle is located at  (47.533215, -122.172101). Coal Creek flows through the city from the Issaquah Alps to Lake Washington.

Newcastle is bordered to the north by Bellevue, to the south by Renton, to the east by unincorporated land on Cougar Mountain, and to the west by Lake Washington.

Climate

Schools
Newcastle is served by two school districts, with the boundary line roughly going north–south just to the west of Coal Creek Parkway. The three "in-city" schools are Newcastle Elementary, which is operated by the Issaquah School District 411 and Hazlewood Elementary next to Risdon Middle School which are operated by Renton School District 403.

District: Issaquah School District 411

Schools: Newcastle Elementary School, Maywood Middle School and Liberty High School

Neighborhoods: The Highlands at Newcastle, East Olympus, Mile Post, Lake Boren, The Trails at Newcastle, China Creek, China Falls, The Reserve at Newcastle

District: Renton School District

Schools: Hazelwood Elementary School, McKnight Middle School, Hazen High School

Neighborhoods: Lake Washington Ridge, West Olympus, Hazelwood, Newport Woods, Newport Hills

Surrounding cities and neighborhoods

Demographics

Although the present-day African American population of Newcastle is small, in the 1880s when it was a mining center, Newcastle had the Puget Sound area's largest African American population, greater even than that of Seattle.

2010 census
As of the census of 2010, there were 10,380 people, 4,021 households, and 2,860 families residing in the city. The racial makeup of the city was 65.4% White, 2.6% African American, 0.4% Native American, 24.7% Asian, 0.3% Pacific Islander, 1.6% from other races, and 5.0% from two or more races. Hispanic or Latino of any race were 4.2% of the population.

There were 4,021 households, of which 35.3% had children under the age of 18 living with them, 61.6% were married couples living together, 6.2% had a female householder with no husband present, 3.3% had a male householder with no wife present, and 28.9% were non-families. 21.8% of all households were made up of individuals, and 4.4% had someone living alone who was 65 years of age or older. The average household size was 2.57 and the average family size was 3.04.

The median age in the city was 38.7 years. 23.7% of residents were under the age of 18; 6.6% were between the ages of 18 and 24; 31.1% were from 25 to 44; 29.7% were from 45 to 64; and 9% were 65 years of age or older. The gender makeup of the city was 49.6% male and 50.4% female.

The median income for a household in the city was $109,833. The per capita income for the city was $58,118. The median home cost in Newcastle is $511,500.

2000 census
As of the census of 2000, there were 7,737 people, 3,028 households, and 2,189 families residing in the city. The population density was 1,731.5 people per square mile (668.3/km2). There were 3,117 housing units at an average density of 697.6 per square mile (269.2/km2). The racial makeup of the city was 75.05% White, 1.62% African American, 0.45% Native American, 18.25% Asian, 0.25% Pacific Islander, 1.36% from other races, and 3.02% from two or more races. Hispanic or Latino of any race were 2.88% of the population.

There were 3,028 households, out of which 34.3% had children under the age of 18 living with them, 63.7% were married couples living together, 5.8% had a female householder with no husband present, and 27.7% were non-families. 20.5% of all households were made up of individuals, and 2.8% had someone living alone who was 65 years of age or older. The average household size was 2.55 and the average family size was 2.98.

In the city the population was spread out, with 23.4% under the age of 18, 7.2% from 18 to 24, 37.9% from 25 to 44, 24.9% from 45 to 64, and 6.6% who were 65 years of age or older. The median age was 36 years. For every 100 females, there were 100.0 males. For every 100 females age 18 and over, there were 97.9 males.

The median income for a household in the city was $80,320, and the median income for a family was $91,381. Males had a median income of $60,639 versus $41,868 for females. The per capita income for the city was $35,057. About 1.8% of families and 2.0% of the population were below the poverty line, including 1.1% of those under age 18 and 6.6% of those age 65 or over.

Notable residents
Newcastle has been a preferred residence of numerous current and former Seattle Seahawks players, coaches, and front office personnel due to its close proximity to the NFL franchise's headquarters and practice facility on Lake Washington at the Virginia Mason Athletic Center (VMAC) in Renton.

 Gus Bradley, former defensive coordinator for the Seattle Seahawks
 Nate Burleson, former NFL player for the Seattle Seahawks and NFL commentator
 John Carlson, former NFL player for the Seattle Seahawks, Minnesota Vikings, and Arizona Cardinals
 Kam Chancellor, NFL player for the Seattle Seahawks
 James Hasty, former NFL player for the Kansas City Chiefs and the New York Jets
 Steve Hutchinson, former NFL player for the Seattle Seahawks
 Julian Peterson, former NFL player for the Seattle Seahawks  
 Dan Quinn, former defensive coordinator for the Seattle Seahawks
 Mack Strong, former NFL player for the Seattle Seahawks
 Marcus Trufant, former NFL player for the Seattle Seahawks
 Alan White, drummer for the progressive rock band Yes

City landmarks
The city of Newcastle has designated the following landmarks:

Golf

Newcastle is known for its 36-hole,  golf complex, which features two championship, 18-hole courses known as the Coal Creek and China Creek courses. Designed by golf course architect Robert E. Cupp in consultation with PGA Masters champion Fred Couples and in partnership with Oki Golf, the courses have views of Mount Rainier, Lake Washington, Lake Sammamish, the Olympic and Cascade mountain ranges, and the downtown skylines of the cities of Seattle and Bellevue. Practice and hospitality facilities include a heated driving range, a pro shop, an 18-hole mini-golf/putting range, private (pitching/putting/chipping) practice tees, and a  clubhouse with restaurants, pubs, and event spaces.

References

External links

Official website

Cities in King County, Washington
Cities in the Seattle metropolitan area
Former census-designated places in Washington (state)
Cities in Washington (state)